Meg Jacobs is a historian of U.S. political history and political economy. She is a Senior Research Scholar at the Princeton School of Public and International Affairs and in the Department of History at Princeton University.

Academics 
Jacobs graduated from Cornell University (BA) and the University of Virginia (MA, PhD). She was a professor at the Massachusetts Institute of Technology, and is a resident scholar at Princeton University.

Her research has centered on the political economy and the development of twentieth-century politics, such as the history of conservatism. In 2006, she won the American Historical Association's Ellis W. Hawley Prize for the best historical study on U.S. politics. Her major works include Pocketbook Politics: Economic Citizenship in Twentieth-Century America (2006) and Panic at the Pump: The Energy Crisis and the Transformation of American Politics in the 1970s (2016).

Family 
In 2012, she married fellow historian and political commentator Julian Zelizer at the Synagogue for the Arts in New York City presided over by the groom's father, Gerald. Her mother-in-law is economic sociologist, Viviana Rotman Zelizer.

Works 
 
 
 Meg Jacobs, Julian E. Zelizer, Conservatives in Power: The Reagan Years, 1981-1989: A Brief History with Documents, Bedford/St. Martin's, 2010,

References

External links 
The Energy Crisis and the End of American Liberalism, slate, April 2016
What's So Natural About Natural Disasters?, Meg Jacobs, videolectures

 

21st-century American historians
Cornell University alumni
University of Virginia alumni
MIT School of Humanities, Arts, and Social Sciences faculty
Princeton University faculty
Living people
Year of birth missing (living people)